Sebra Yen (born December 13, 1989) is a Taiwanese-American figure skater who competes internationally for Taiwan in men's singles. He is the 2009 Taiwanese National Junior Champion  and 2010 Taiwanese National Silver Medalist.

Skating background 
Yen started skating at the age of 13. He won the Taiwan National Figure Skating Championships on the junior level in 2009. Yen made his international debut at the 2008–2009 ISU Junior Grand Prix Mexico City competition at the age of 18, representing Taiwan. He made his senior debut at the 2009 Four Continents Figure Skating Championships in Vancouver, British Columbia, Canada.

Competitive highlights

Programs

References

External links 
 

Taiwanese male single skaters
American male single skaters
Living people
1989 births
Sportspeople from Charlottesville, Virginia
American sportspeople of Taiwanese descent